Halcyon is a name originally derived from Alcyone of Greek mythology. 

Halcyon or Halcyone may refer to:

Arts and entertainment

Television 
 Halcyon (TV series), a Virtual Reality murder mystery on SyFy
 The Halcyon, British period drama on ITV

Games 
 Halcyon (console), a video-game console
 Halcyon (role-playing game), an indie role-playing game
 Halcyon, a fictional star system in the action role-playing game The Outer Worlds

Music 
 Halcyon Records, a record label founded by Marian McPartland

Albums 
 Halcyon (album), a 2012 Ellie Goulding album, also the title song
 Halcyon (Best Of), a 2005 album by Orbital
 Halcyon, a 1996 EP by Solstice

Songs 
 "Halcyon" (Chicane song), 2000
 "Halcyon" (Delphic song), 2010
 "Halcyon" (Orbital song), 1992
 "Halcyon", by Andy Moor, 2005
 "Halcyon", by ATB from Dedicated, 2002
 "Halcyon", by Enter Shikari from Common Dreads, 2009
 "Halcyon", by Glass Towers, 2013
 "Halcyon", by Noisia and The Upbeats, 2019
 "Halcyon", by Spiritbox from Eternal Blue, 2021
 "Halcyon", by Windhand from Eternal Return, 2018
 "Halcyon (Beautiful Days)", by Mono from Walking Cloud and Deep Red Sky, Flag Fluttered and the Sun Shined, 2004
 "Halcyon: The Heavy Silence: In Silent Rain", by ...And Oceans from Cypher, 2002

In print 
 Halcyon (book), a collection of poems by Gabriele D'Annunzio, published in 1903
 Halcyon, a comic book published by Image Comics
 Halcyon (Stargate Atlantis novel), a novel by James Swallow
 Halcyone, a 1912 novel by Elinor Glyn

Other arts and entertainment 
 Halcyon (dialogue), a short dialogue attributed to Plato
 The Halcyon Company, a film studio founded in 2007
 Halcyone, a 1915 painting by Herbert James Draper

Birds 
 Halcyon (genus), a genus of kingfishers

Buildings 
 Halcyon Castle, a castle in Travancore, Kerala, India
 Halcyon (Forsyth County, Georgia) near Atlanta, a large mixed-use development
 Halcyon Gallery, a group of three art galleries in the United Kingdom
 Halcyon House, a Georgian style home in Washington, D.C., United States

Places in the United States 
 Halcyon, California, an unincorporated community
 Halcyon, Missouri, a ghost town
 Halcyon, West Virginia, an unincorporated community

Ships 
 , several ships of the British Royal Navy
 , more than one United States Navy ship
 Halcyon-class minesweeper, a type of British Royal Navy minesweeper
 , a research vessel in the fleet of the United States Bureau of Fisheries from 1919 to 1927
 Halcyon 23, a British sailboat design
 Halcyone, a sailing yacht built by J W Miller & Sons and launched in 1934

Other uses 
 Halcyone, alternate spelling of Alcyone, a figure in Greek mythology
 Halcyon Monitoring Solutions, a company that monitors performance of computer systems
 Halcyon Dive Systems, a diving equipment company that produces the Halcyon RB80 rebreather
 Halcyone Barnes (1913–1988), American collage artist and watercolor painter
 John Styn, also known as Halcyon Lujah, American blogger and entrepreneur
 Halcyon linear accelerator, produced by Varian Medical Systems
 Halcyon, a hypersonic airliner under development by Hermeus Corporation

See  also 
 Alcione (disambiguation)
 Alcyone (disambiguation)
 Halcion (triazolam), an insomnia drug
 Halcyon Days (disambiguation)